In the Land Of is the seventh album by Canadian indie rock band Wintersleep, released on March 19, 2019 through Dine Alone Records.

The band began working on the album a year after releasing their previous effort The Great Detachment. They teamed up with renowned producer Tony Doogan who also produced Welcome to the Night Sky and New Inheritors during months of 2018 and tracked the album at studios in Montreal, Kingston and Toronto.

The band released first single "Surrender" in late 2018, and the rest of the album's singles, "Beneficiary", "Forest Fire" and "In the Shape of Your Heart" followed in early 2019.

Following the album's release date, Dine Alone Records announced a limited issue of "splatter" coloured vinyl LPs for sale via their website.

Track listing

Credits
Aaron Goldstein – Pedal Steel
Jace Lasek – Therevox & Additional tracking at Breakglass Studios, Montreal
Rich Carey – Artwork
Jud Haynes - Graphic Design & Layout
Greg Calbi – Mastering
Jon Samuel – Group Member, Keyboard
Loel Campbell – Group Member, Drums, Percussion
Chris Bell – Group Member, Bass Guitar
Paul Murphy – Group Member, Lead Vocals, Guitar
Tim D'Eon – Group Member, Guitar (occasionally keyboard)
Tony Doogan – Engineer, Producer
John Agnello – Mixing (Tracks 1, 4, 5 and 7-10)
Michael H. Brauer – Mixing (Tracks 2, 3 & 6)
Calvin Hartwick – Mixing Engineer
Fernando Reyes – Assistant Mixing Engineer
Nyles Spencer – Assistant Engineer
Luke Schindler – Assistant Engineer
Gemma Mazza – Assistant Engineer

References

2019 albums
Wintersleep albums
Albums produced by Tony Doogan